Material Queen is a 2011 Taiwanese romance drama television series, a co-production between Next TV's producer Chen Yu-shan and CTS. It stars Vanness Wu and Lynn Hung. It premiered on June 17, 2011, on CTS. The drama was filmed in Taiwan and France.

Synopsis
Lin Chu Man (Lynn Hung), a fashion model with a sweet appearance and a body that stands out from the other models, does not prejudice against a man for being short, fat, ugly or old, as long as he is rich. One day, she met Cai Jia Hao (Vanness Wu) and thought she had met her perfect Mr. Right, but she doesn't know that he is actually a hired body double for the billionaire "Mr. William Norman". When she discovers that Jia Hao is only a hired body double and his true identity is a penniless music student, she immediately dumps him. As karma would have it, she loses her job to a younger model, her rich lover dumps her and she finds out that Cai Jia Hao will be her new roommate. Chu Man and Jia Hao's unexpected living arrangement forces them to reconcile and to really get to know each other. As Chu Man becomes closer to Jia Hao, her goal of nabbing the real estate tycoon Yan Kai Ming (Daniel Chan) becomes less of a priority. She starts to question whether being rich is what she truly desires.

Cast

Main
Vanness Wu as Cai Jia Hao 
Lynn Hung as Lin Chu Man

Supporting 
Daniel Chan as Yan Kai Ming
Jessie Chiang as Lu Yi Xian
Harry Chang as Ke Mai Long
Annie Chen as Sha Xia

Extended cast
 Na Wei Dong as Peter Pan
 Meng Fan Gui as Director Dong
 Lin Mei-hsiu as Cai Jia Hui
 Qu Zhong Heng as LEO
 He Wen Hui as Jiang Bao
 David Chen as Brother Sharp
 Yang Li-yin as Big Nanny
 Zhang Huai Qiu as Ke Mai Long (Cameron)

Guest cast
 Jay Shih as Chia-hao (episode 17)
 Frankie Huang as Fang Chih-hui (episode 2)

Broadcast

References

External links
CTS official site

Taiwanese drama television series
Chinese Television System original programming
2011 Taiwanese television series debuts
2011 Taiwanese television series endings
Television series set in the 2010s